The Detroit Mustangs was an American soccer club based in Detroit, Michigan that was a member of the American Soccer League. The Mustangs began their first season known simply as Detroit S.C..

Year-by-year

M
Defunct soccer clubs in Michigan
American Soccer League (1933–1983) teams
1972 establishments in Michigan
1973 disestablishments in Michigan
Soccer clubs in Michigan
Association football clubs established in 1972
Association football clubs disestablished in 1973